Gary Schaff (13 November 1959 – 7 August 2020) was a Canadian Paralympic athlete. In the 1988 Summer Paralympics he won a silver medal in the men's discus throw. He also placed fifth in the shot put event in the same Paralympics.

References

External links
Biography Gary Schaff

1959 births
2020 deaths
Athletes (track and field) at the 1988 Summer Paralympics
Paralympic silver medalists for Canada
Athletes from Vancouver
Medalists at the 1988 Summer Paralympics
Paralympic medalists in athletics (track and field)
Paralympic track and field athletes of Canada
Canadian male discus throwers
Wheelchair discus throwers
Paralympic discus throwers